WBCH (1220 AM) is a radio station licensed to Hastings, Michigan broadcasting a news/talk format.

Sources 
Michiguide.com - WBCH History

External links

BCH (AM)
Hastings, Michigan